Roslyn Litman (September 30, 1928 - October 4, 2016) was an American attorney. In 1966 she negotiated a settlement with the National Basketball Association on behalf of blackballed player Connie Hawkins on the basis of antitrust. In her first appearance before the U.S. Supreme Court in 1989, she successfully argued to remove a nativity scene from display in the Allegheny County courthouse in Pittsburgh, Pennsylvania.

Early life and education 
Litman was born Eta Roslyn Margolis in Brooklyn on Sept. 30, 1928, in Brooklyn, to Ukrainian immigrants Harry and Dorothy Perlow Margolis. She had an older sister, Ruth. Her father was a clothing salesman and her mother a milliner. Litman attended Erasmus Hall High School. After she had graduated high school, the family moved to Western Pennsylvania.

Litman attended the University of Pittsburgh, where she met her husband-to-be, S. David Litman, who was in law school there. She received a bachelor's degree in 1949, started law school, and graduated in 1952 first in her class. She joined the ACLU while in law school.

Career 
Litman was rejected by major law firms because she was a woman, so she and her husband formed their own firm.

One of Litman's first cases was arguing the right of the American Nazi Party to demonstrate in Pittsburgh.

Litman and her husband, fellow lawyer S. David Litman, successfully argued in 1966 judgement in favor of a blackballed former NBA player, Connie Hawkins, on antitrust grounds. The NBA had refused to allow any team to hire Hawkins, who at the time was playing for the Harlem Globetrotters. The league agreed to a $1.3M settlement in 1969 and Hawkins was signed by the Phoenix Suns and eventually was inducted into the Hall of Fame.

In 1989, in her first appearance before the U.S. Supreme Court, Litman successfully argued on behalf of the ACLU of Pennsylvania to remove a nativity scene from display in the Allegheny County courthouse in Pittsburgh, Pennsylvania.

Litman and other members of a team of lawyers won a settlement of $415M, a record in 1991, from Continental Can Company, which the team had argued had laid off 3000 workers to avoid pension liabilities.

Personal life 
Litman married S. David Litman; the couple had three children, including Harry Litman and Jessica Litman. She served on the national board of the ACLU for thirty years, including as one of the organization's five National Counsel.

Her husband died in 1996. Litman died of pancreatic cancer in Pittsburgh on October 4, 2016. She was 88.

References

Further reading 

 

American women lawyers
People from Brooklyn
Lawyers from Pittsburgh
University of Pittsburgh alumni
University of Pittsburgh School of Law alumni